The 2010 Texas House of Representatives elections took place as part of the biennial United States elections. Texas voters elected state senators in all 150 State House of Representatives districts. State representatives serve for two-year terms.

Following the 2008 Texas State House of Representatives elections, the Democrats nearly gained control of the House with 74 members to the Republicans' 76.

As one member of the Democratic Party had switched his party affiliation to Republican, in order to claim control of the chamber from Republicans, the Democrats needed to gain three seats. In the end, they ended up losing twenty two seats in the midst of a nationwide Republican wave election. On December 14, 2010, Democrat Allan Ritter announced he would be changing his party affiliation to Republican. On the same day, Democrat Aaron Peña announced he would be switching to the Republican Party as well, claiming that the Democratic Party no longer aligned with his conservative values. This left the party balance at 101 Republicans and 49 Democrats at the start of the Eighty-second Texas Legislature when it convened on January 11, 2011.

Results

Statewide

Close races 
Seats where the margin of victory was under 10%:

Notable races 
District 11: Representative Chuck Hopson (D-Jacksonville) was re-elected as a Democrat in 2008 with 49.29% of the vote. On November 6, 2009, he announced that he would switch parties and seek re-election as a Republican. He would later go on to win re-election in 2010 with 75.82% of the vote

Results by district

References

House of Representatives
Texas House of Representatives elections
Texas House